BC Kolín, for sponsorship reasons known as BK Geosan Kolín, is a Czech professional basketball club based in the town of Kolín. They play in the Czech National Basketball League (NBL), the highest competition in the Czech Republic. Kolín plays its home games in the Hala SOU Spojů.

Honours
Czech Republic Basketball Cup
Runners-up (1): 2020–21

Players

Current roster

Notable players

 Stanislav Zuzák
 Manny Ubilla
 Dejan Radulović
 Demarius Bolds

External links 
Official Site 
Eurobasket.com BC Kolin Page

Basketball teams in the Czech Republic
Basketball teams established in 1940
Sport in Kolín